Lutetian limestone (in French, calcaire lutécien, and formerly calcaire grossier) — also known as “Paris stone” — is a variety of limestone particular to the Paris, France, area. It has been a source of wealth as an economic and versatile building material since ancient Roman times (see Mines of Paris) and has contributed markedly to the unique visual appeal of the “City of Light”. (It has been hailed as “the warm, elusive, cream-grey stone of the French capital”.) Its formation dates to the Eocene epoch's Lutetian age (between  ). The name "Lutetian" derives from Lutetia (French, Lutèce) which was the city's name in ancient times.

History
Between the 17th and 19th centuries, Lutetian limestone was extracted by tunneling through hill-sides south of Paris. The stone comprises many of the grandest Paris buildings from the 17th century onwards, including parts of the Louvre, the Place de la Concorde and Les Invalides.

Haussmann's grand renovation of Paris (1853–1870), which provided a sweeping and uniform style and an elusive coloring — ranging from bright white to butter-yellow to a dull nicotine-yellow/grey — for the city, relied upon buildings faced with Lutetian limestone.

In the 20th century, open-cast quarries were developed which uncovered thinner layers of harder limestone closer to the surface north of Paris. A now fashionable variety of Lutetian limestone from about 25 miles north of Paris is known as “Oise stone” or "Saint-Maximin limestone" and has become popular internationally for upscale building projects. In 2007, the quarries in southern Oise, around Saint-Maximin and Chantilly, applied to the French government to become the first to be granted a building stone Appellation Contrôlée – the badge of official French regional excellence – as if it were a wine or a cheese. According to a 2007 article in the UK's The Independent: “The harder, sliceable limestone sells for around €2,000 a cubic metre. The different grades of softer building stone sell for between €550 and €150 a cubic metre, which is very competitive with other building stone all around the world.”

References

See also
List of types of limestone

Limestone
Building stone
Geography of Paris
History of Paris
Paris